
The Shalem Institute for Spiritual Formation is a Christian educational organization that offers programs with the stated goal of providing "in-depth support for contemplative living and leadership." The institute was incorporated in 1979 having grown out of a group that began meeting in 1973 in Washington, D.C. The institute is an associate member of the Washington Theological Consortium.

References

External links
 

Christian educational institutions
Edgewood (Washington, D.C.)
Organizations established in 1979